Trench fever (also known as "five-day fever", "quintan fever", and "urban trench fever") is a moderately serious disease transmitted by body lice. It infected armies in Flanders, France, Poland, Galicia, Italy, Salonika, Macedonia, Mesopotamia, Russia and Egypt in World War I. Three noted cases during WWI were the authors J. R. R. Tolkien, A. A. Milne, and C. S. Lewis. From 1915 to 1918 between one-fifth and one-third of all British troops reported ill had trench fever while about one-fifth of ill German and Austrian troops had the disease. The disease persists among the homeless. Outbreaks have been documented, for example, in Seattle and Baltimore in the United States among injection drug users and in Marseille, France, and Burundi.

Trench fever is also called Wolhynia fever, shin bone fever, Meuse fever, His disease, and His–Werner disease or Werner-His disease (after Wilhelm His Jr. and Heinrich Werner).

The disease is caused by the bacterium Bartonella quintana (older names: Rochalimea quintana, Rickettsia quintana), found in the stomach walls of the body louse. Bartonella quintana is closely related to Bartonella henselae, the agent of cat scratch fever and bacillary angiomatosis.

Signs and symptoms
The disease is classically a five-day fever of the relapsing type, rarely exhibiting a continuous course. The incubation period is relatively long, at about two weeks. The onset of symptoms is usually sudden, with high fever, severe headache, pain on moving the eyeballs, soreness of the muscles of the legs and back, and frequent hyperaesthesia of the shins. The initial fever is usually followed in a few days by a single, short rise but there may be many relapses between periods without fever. The most constant symptom is pain in the legs. Trench fever episodes may involve loss of appetite, shin pain or tenderness, and splene enlargement. Generally, one to five periodic episodes of fever occur, separated by four-to-six-day-long asymptomatic periods. Recovery takes a month or more. Lethal cases are rare, but in a few cases "the persistent fever might lead to heart failure". Aftereffects may include neurasthenia, cardiac disturbances, and myalgia.

Pathophysiology
Bartonella quintana is transmitted by contamination of a skin abrasion or louse-bite wound with the faeces of an infected body louse (Pediculus humanus corporis). There have also been reports of an infected louse bite passing on the infection.

Diagnosis
Serological testing is typically used to obtain a definitive diagnosis. Most serological tests would succeed only after a certain period of time past the symptom onset (usually a week). The differential diagnosis list includes typhus, ehrlichiosis, leptospirosis, Lyme disease, and virus-caused exanthema (measles or rubella).

Treatment
 The treatment of trench fever can vary from case to case, as the human body has the ability to rid itself of the disease without medical intervention. Some patients will require treatment, and others will not. For those who do require treatment, the best treatment comes by way of doxycycline in combination with gentamicin.  Chloramphenicol is an alternative medication recommended under circumstances that render the use of tetracycline derivates undesirable, such as severe liver disease, kidney dysfunction, in children under nine years and in pregnant women. The medication is administered for seven to ten days.

Epidemiology
Trench fever is a vector-borne disease in which humans are primarily the main hosts. The vector through which the disease is typically transmitted is referred to as the human body louse "Pediculus humanus humanus", which is better known as lice. The British Expeditionary Force Pyrexia of Unknown Origin Enquiry Sub-Committee concluded that the specific means by which the vector infected the host was louse waste entering the body through abraded skin. Although the disease is typically found in humans, the gram-negative bacterium which induces the disease has been seen in mammals such as dogs, cats, and macaques in small numbers.

Being that the vector of the disease is a human body louse, it can be determined that the main risk factors for infection are mostly in relation to contracting body louse. Specifically, some risk factors include body louse infestation, overcrowded and unhygienic conditions, body hygiene, war, famine, malnutrition, alcoholism, homelessness, and intravenous drug abuse.

The identified risk factors directly correlate with the subpopulations of identified infected persons throughout the duration of the known disease. Historically, trench fever was found in young male soldiers of World War I, whereas in the 21st century the disease mostly has a prevalence in middle-aged homeless men. This can be seen when looking at a 21st-century outbreak of the disease in Denver, Colorado, where researcher David McCormick and his colleagues came across the gram-negative bacterium in 15% of the 241 homeless persons who were tested. Another study done in Marseille, France found the bacterium in 5.4% of the 930 homeless individuals they tested.

History
Trench fever was first described and reported by British major John Graham in June 1915. He reported symptoms such as dizziness, headaches, and pain in the shins and back. The disease was most common in the military and consequently took much longer to identify than usual. These cases were originally confused for dengue, sandfly, or paratyphoid fever. Because insects were the suspected vector of transmission, Alexander Peacock published a study of the body louse in 1916. Due in part to his findings, the louse was determined to be the primary cause of transmission by many, but this was still contested by multiple voices in the field such as John Muir who believed the disease was of a viral nature. In 1917, the Trench Fever Investigation Commission (TFIC) had its first meeting. The TFIC performed experiments with infected blood and louse and learned much about the disease and louse behavior. Also in 1917, the American Red Cross started the Medical Research Committee (MRC). The MRC performed human experiments on trench fever, and their research was published in March 1918. The MRC and TFIC findings were very similar essentially confirming the louse as the vector of transmission. It was not until the 1920s that the bacteria B Quintana was identified as the cause of trench fever.

During World War II, the British Government commissioned sheep dip manufacturer, Cooper, McDougall & Robertson of Berkhamsted, Herts to develop a product which troops could use to ward off lice. After much trial and error, 'AL63', was developed and successfully used in a powder form. The initials stood for 'Anti-Louse' and it was the 63rd preparation which was the most efficacious.

References

External links 

Bacterial diseases
Bacterium-related cutaneous conditions
Trench warfare